The Albanian State Road 2 (SH2), (Albanian: Rruga Shteterore 2) is a dual carriageway in Albania linking the port city of Durrës with the metropolis and the capital Tirana. The road was the first highway to be reconstructed in Albania, following the Fall of Communism in 1991.

Route 

The National Road SH2 begins at the Port of Durrës in Durrës, at the Dajlani Overpass (Albanian: Ura e Dajlanit), bypasses Shijak, intersects with SH52 in Vorë, bypasses the road to Tirana International Airport, and ends at the Kamza Overpass (Albanian: Mbikalimi i Kamzës) in the outskirts of Tirana where it meets National Road SH1 heading to northern Albania. Once entering Tirana, the highway becomes the street named Rruga 29 Nëntori.

Gallery

See also 
 Transport in Albania 
 Economy of Albania

References

External links 
New signage and look along Tirana-Durres Highway

National roads in Albania
Transport in Durrës County
Transport in Tirana County